Moment of inertia, denoted by , measures the extent to which an object resists rotational acceleration about a particular axis, it is the rotational analogue to mass (which determines an object's resistance to linear acceleration). The moments of inertia of a mass have units of dimension ML2([mass] × [length]2). It should not be confused with the second moment of area, which is used in beam calculations. The mass moment of inertia is often also known as the rotational inertia, and sometimes as the angular mass.

For simple objects with geometric symmetry, one can often determine the moment of inertia in an exact closed-form expression. Typically this occurs when the mass density is constant, but in some cases the density can vary throughout the object as well. In general, it may not be straightforward to symbolically express the moment of inertia of shapes with more complicated mass distributions and lacking symmetry. When calculating moments of inertia, it is useful to remember that it is an additive function and exploit the parallel axis and perpendicular axis theorems.

This article mainly considers symmetric mass distributions, with constant density throughout the object, and the axis of rotation is taken to be through the center of mass unless otherwise specified.

Moments of inertia

Following are scalar moments of inertia. In general, the moment of inertia is a tensor, see below.

List of 3D inertia tensors 

This list of moment of inertia tensors is given for principal axes of each object.

To obtain the scalar moments of inertia I above, the tensor moment of inertia I is projected along some axis defined by a unit vector n according to the formula:

where the dots indicate tensor contraction and the Einstein summation convention is used. In the above table, n would be the unit Cartesian basis ex, ey, ez to obtain Ix, Iy, Iz respectively.

See also
 List of second moments of area
 Parallel axis theorem
 Perpendicular axis theorem

Notes

References

External links
The inertia tensor of a tetrahedron
Tutorial on deriving moment of inertia for common shapes

Moment of inertia
Moments of inertia
Physical quantities
Rigid bodies
Tensors
Moment (physics)

he:טנזור התמד#דוגמאות